is a Japanese video game development studio established in 2011 by CyberAgent. Mobile and e-commerce company DeNA acquired a 24% stake in the studio in 2012, and Nintendo acquired another 5% stake in 2018, leaving CyberAgent with 69% of the shares and as such, they are the parent company of Cygames. From its formation, the company produced mobile games, initially on the Mobage platform, and from 2013 on Android and iOS. The company headquarters is located in Tokyo while other divisions are located in Osaka and Saga in Japan and Seoul, South Korea.

Key IPs include Uma Musume Pretty Derby (2021), Princess Connect! Re:Dive (2018), Shadowverse (2016), Granblue Fantasy (2014), The Idolmaster Cinderella Girls (2011, with Bandai Namco Entertainment), and Rage of Bahamut (2011). The company began development of console games in 2015. In 2016 Cygames announced the establishment of an anime studio CygamesPictures. The company also began funding anime for its mobile property and for new projects and adaptations for anime. The company also entered the manga, music and design market in the time period.

History
Cygames, Inc. was established in 2011 by CyberAgent, a Japanese web services company. In 2012, DeNA purchased a 24% stake in Cygames. Shortly thereafter, the studio was chosen by Gamasutra as one of the top 10 game developers of the year.

In June 2012, Cygames founded CyDesignation, a company specialized in Design, Illustration, Game planning and Game development.

In March 2016, Cygames announced the establishment of its own anime production division and anime studio as a subsidiary known as CygamesPictures to do planning, production and animation both for Cygames own IPs and original anime projects as well.

In June 2016, Cygames announced the acquisition of the gaming and anime background studio Kusanagi.

In 2016, Cygames announced that it was developing Project Awakening, its first large-format title for consoles as well as the establishment of their Osaka studio focused on console games.

In May 2017, Cygames and Kodansha announced that they formed a partnership to launch a new label called Cycomi to release volumes in print distributed by Kodansha for manga already published online by Cygames on its digital manga website called Cycomics. However, in April 2019, Cygames formed a new partnership with Shogakukan.

On June 8, 2017, Cygames and its parent company CyberAgent announced that they jointly established CA-Cygames Anime Fund”, a fund for investing in anime IP which will inject funds to the anime production committee to obtain the rights to stream anime videos on the Internet and produce games with a total amount of funds to be 3 billion yen.

In 2017, Cygames founded its esports team, Cygames Beast, with Street Fighter players Daigo Umehara, Snake Eyez, and PR Balrog. Since July 2017, Cygames is an official sponsor of Juventus Football Club. In April 2018, a partnership with Nintendo was announced to develop the game Dragalia Lost, for the purpose of facilitating the partnership Nintendo will obtain approximately 5 percent of Cygames's issued stocks.

In May 2018, Cygames announced the establishment of a subsidiary for music production and artist management called Cymusic.

Games developed

Mobile/web browser games

Console games

References

External links
 

Mobile game companies
Video game companies established in 2011
Video game companies of Japan
Video game development companies
Japanese companies established in 2011
Software companies based in Tokyo
CyberAgent